Third-seeded Sven Davidson defeated Herbert Flam 6–3, 6–4, 6–4 in the final to win the men's singles tennis title at the 1957 French Championships.

Seeds
The seeded players are listed below. Sven Davidson is the champion; others show the round in which they were eliminated.

  Lew Hoad (third round)
  Ashley Cooper (semifinals)
  Sven Davidson (champion)
  Giuseppe Merlo (fourth round)
  Mervyn Rose (semifinals)
  Nicola Pietrangeli (first round)
  Budge Patty (fourth round)
  Herbert Flam (final)
  Pierre Darmon (second round)
  Neale Fraser (quarterfinals)
  Jacques Brichant (quarterfinals)
  Jaroslav Drobný (second round)
  Robert Haillet (quarterfinals)
  Paul Remy (fourth round)
  Mike Davies (third round)
  Luis Ayala (third round)

Draw

Key
 Q = Qualifier
 WC = Wild card
 LL = Lucky loser
 r = Retired

Finals

Earlier rounds

Section 1

Section 2

Section 3

Section 4

Section 5

Section 6

Section 7

Section 8

External links
   on the French Open website

1957
1957 in French tennis